The Silent Man may refer to:
 The Silent Man (film), a 1917 Western silent film
 The Silent Man, a 2009 thriller novel by Alex Berenson
 Mark Felt: The Man Who Brought Down the White House, a 2017 film filmed under the working title The Silent Man